Sendi Bar (sometimes Sandy Bar; ; born April 5, 1976) is an Israeli actress and model.

Sendi Baranes was born in Tel Aviv, Israel, to a Sephardic Jewish family. Her father is a Libyan-born Jew, whereas her mother is Israeli-born and of Iraqi-Jewish descent.

Bar appeared in commercials for Black and Wild beer, Milki and Isracart. She modeled for fashion companies Castro and Pilpel. Bar started her acting career in 1996 in the TV drama Deadly Fortune, directed by Eran Riklis. It was broadcast on prime time in Channel and was followed by roles in Zbeng! and Zinzana.

She was married to Israel actor Aki Avni during the early 2000s, having a son born in 2004. They resided for several years in Los Angeles, but returned to Israel in 2008 and separated.

References

Prisoners of War | TV Series (2009–2012)

External links
 
 

1976 births
Israeli female models
Israeli television actresses
Living people
Actresses from Tel Aviv
21st-century Israeli actresses
Jewish Israeli actresses
Israeli people of Turkish-Jewish descent
Israeli people of Libyan-Jewish descent
Israeli Sephardi Jews
Israeli Mizrahi Jews